The women's tournament of the football at the 2022 South American Games was held from 5 to 11 October 2022 at the Complejo de Fútbol in Luque, Paraguay, a sub-venue outside Asunción. It was the third edition of the football women's tournament at the South American Games since its first appearance in Santiago 2014 (It had been scheduled to be held in Medellin 2010 but ended being cancelled).

The tournament was restricted to under-20 players (born on or after 1 January 2002).

Hosts and defending champions Paraguay were unable to retain their title after finishing second in their group, which led them to play the bronze medal match which they lost 1–0 to Colombia.

Venezuela won the gold medal and their first South American Games women's football title by beating Uruguay in the final on penalties after a 2–2 draw.

Schedule
The tournament was held over a 7-day period, from 5 to 11 October.

Teams
A total of eight ODESUR NOCs entered teams for the women's tournament.

Rosters

Each participating NOC had to enter a roster of 18 players (Technical manual Article 9). Players had to be born on or after 1 January 2002 to be eligible (Technical manual Article 1).

Venue
All matches were played at the Complejo de Fútbol courts located within the Parque Olímpico cluster in Luque, Paraguay, owned by the Paraguayan Olympic Committee.

Results
All match times are in PYST (UTC−3).

Group stage
The group stage consisted of two groups of 3 teams, each group was played under the round-robin format. The winners of each group advanced to the gold medal match while the runners-up advanced to the bronze medal match.

Teams were ranked according to points earned (3 points for a win, 1 point for a draw, 0 points for a loss). If tied on points,  the following tiebreakers were applied (Technical manual Article 10.1):
Goal difference;
Goals scored;
Fewest goals against;
Fewest red cards received;
Fewest yellow cards received;
Drawing of lots.

Group A

Group B

Final stage
The final stage consisted of the bronze and gold medal matches. If one or both matches were tied after 90 minutes, the match was decided directly by a penalty shoot-out.

Bronze medal match

Gold medal match

Goalscorers

Final ranking

Medalists

See also
Football at the 2022 South American Games – Men's tournament

References

External links
 Soccer Teams Female at ASU2022 official website.

Football